Marie Krarup Soelberg (born 6 December 1965 in Seem near Ribe) is a Danish politician, who is a member of the Folketing for the Danish People's Party. She was elected into parliament in the 2011 Danish general election.

Political career
Krarup was elected into parliament in the 2011 election, where she received 1,659 votes. This was enough for one of the Danish People's Party's levelling seats. She was reelected in 2015, receiving 2,436	votes, winning a direct seat into parliament. She was elected again in 2019, where she received 1,618 votes. She left the party in February 2022, following an internal dispute in the party about the recently elected chairman Morten Messerschmidt.

Bibliography
Ny kold krig - Marie Krarup taler med 17 eksperter fra øst til vest (2018)

References

External links 
 Biography on the website of the Danish Parliament (Folketinget)

Living people
1965 births
People from Esbjerg Municipality
Danish People's Party politicians
Women members of the Folketing
21st-century Danish women politicians
Members of the Folketing 2011–2015
Members of the Folketing 2015–2019
Members of the Folketing 2019–2022